Marion Diederichs-Lafite (born 17 December 1947) is an Austrian music journalist.

Life 
Diederichs-Lafite was born in Vienna. After training at the French School and the "Sacré Cœur" secondary school in Vienna and a business course at the Vienna Commercial Academy, the daughter of Peter and  studied musicology and journalism at the universities of Vienna, Cologne and Bochum from 1967, supplemented by courses at the Vienna Music Academy with Erwin Ratz and music seminars of the European Forum Alpbach with Rudolf Stephan and Carl Dahlhaus. In 1974 she received her doctorate at the University of Vienna with a dissertation on Music aesthetics in the early 19th century as presented in the "Leipziger Allgemeine musikalische Zeitung".

In the Österreichische Musikzeitschrift run by her mother where she started working as a staff member in 1970, she became co-publisher from 1980 on, took over the company in 1986 and was mainly responsible for the ÖMZ and the Verlag Lafite from 1990 on. For the design of country booklets she travelled to the USA (1975), Switzerland (1976) or England (1984) for in-depth research. Her main task was to deal with all topics and their leading authors. She started creative cooperations with composers' associations and also with musicology, opened the journal on current art music as well as on cultural-political questions with a forum of contemporary music discussions and accentuated (personally) special issues on music-aesthetic, pedagogical or gender-oriented topics.

Diederichs-Lafite edited a total of over 450 music periodicals and over 15 books of the Musikzeitedition.

 Memberships and awards 
 Awarding of the title "Professor" 1999 
 Board member of the Ernst-Krenek-Institut-Privatstiftung
 Member of the Board of the Arnold Schönberg Center Private Foundation
 Board member of the Austrian Society for Music.

 Publications 
 Hanslicks unterschätzte Wegbereiter. In Gloria Withalm, Anna Spohn, Gerald Bast (edit.): Kunst, Kontext, Kultur. Festschrift für Manfred Wagner. Springer, Vienna 2012, .
 (Würdigung Hartmut Krones). In Julia Bungardt (edit.): Wiener Musikgeschichte: Annäherungen, Analysen, Ausblicke. Festschrift für Hartmut Krones. Böhlau, Vienna 2009, Kunst und Wissenschaft gehören zusammen, Interview with Cordula Bösze, in Freistil'' 41 February, Vienna 2012, .

External links 
 
 Carriere

References 

Women musicologists
Austrian women journalists
Austrian music journalists
20th-century Austrian musicologists
21st-century musicologists
1947 births
Living people
Journalists from Vienna
20th-century Austrian journalists
21st-century Austrian journalists